Sir Henry Peachey, 1st Baronet  (c. 1671–1737), of New Grove, Petworth, Sussex, was a British landowner and Whig politician who sat in the House of Commons   in three periods between 1701 and 1737.

Early life

Peachey was the eldest son of William Peachey of Newgrove a London merchant who acquired a seat at Petworth by marriage. In 1685 Peachey succeeded to Newgrove on the death of his father. He was educated at Eton College in 1685 and matriculated at Trinity College, Oxford on 22 November 1689, aged 18.  He married Jane Garrett, (Jarrett) daughter of William Garrett (Jarrett- See the Jarrett family of Aldington Worcestershire.) of St Dionis Backchurch, London, on 16 May 1693.  He was knighted on 22 March 1696.

Career
Peachey stood for Parliament at Midhurst in 1698 but was unsuccessful. At the second general election of 1701 he was returned in a contest as Whig Member of Parliament for Sussex. He acted as teller on 27 February 1702. He does not appear to have stood at the 1702 English general election and was defeated at Sussex at the 1705 English general election. He was returned to Parliament again for Sussex at the 1708 British general election. He voted in favour of naturalizing the Palatines in 1709 and was teller in favour of the Whig candidate on 8 March. He was the first named to a drafting committee for a bill to improve the Chichester Road on 9 February 1710. He voted for the impeachment of Dr Sacheverell in 1710. At the 1710 British general election he was defeated, and did not stand again for over 20 years.

Peachey applied to the Duke of Newcastle for support as a prospective candidate for Sussex at a by-election in 1728, but was not adopted. He stood for Haslemere at the 1734 British general election, but withdrew before the poll.  He was created baronet on 21 March 1736, with a special remainder to his brothers John and James. Shortly after, he was returned as MP for Midhurst in a by-election on 2 February 1736 in succession to his brother, Bulstrode Peachey Knight.

Death and legacy
Peachey died on 23 August 1737, aged 66. His two sons predeceased him and he left two daughters. He was succeeded in the baronetcy according to remainder by his brother John.

References

1670s births
1737 deaths
British MPs 1708–1710
British MPs 1734–1741
Members of the Parliament of Great Britain for English constituencies
Baronets in the Baronetage of Great Britain